Morena district is one of the 52 districts of the central Indian state of Madhya Pradesh, located in the Chambal division.

Divisions
Morena district comprises four sub-divisions: Morena, Ambah, Joura and Sabalgarh. Morena sub-division comprises a lone tehsil and a lone block: Morena. Ambah sub-division comprises two tehsils and blocks: Ambah and Porsa. Joura sub-division comprises Joura tehsil, which is further divided into two blocks: Joura and Pahargarh. Sabalgarh sub-division has two tehsils and blocks: Sabalgarh and Kailaras. 

The district has six Vidhan Sabha constituencies: Sabalgarh, Joura, Sumawali, Morena, Dimani and Ambah. All of these are part of Morena Lok Sabha constituency. The nearest public airport is Gwalior Airport.

Demographics

According to the 2011 census, Morena District has a population of 1,965,970, roughly equal to the nation of Lesotho or the US state of New Mexico. This gives it a ranking of 236th in India (out of a total of 640). Its population growth rate over the decade 2001-2011 was 23.38%. 

Morena has a sex ratio of 839 females for every 1000 males, and a literacy rate of 72.07%. 23.93% of the population lives in urban areas. Scheduled Castes and Scheduled Tribes make up 21.44% and 0.87% of the population respectively.

Hindi is the predominant language, spoken by 99.81% of the population. The dialect of the region is Bundeli.

Religion 

Hinduism is the majority religion in the district, followed by more than 95% of the total population and the district has many significant Hindu temples. Islam is the second most followed religion, with 3.9% of the population with Jainism and Buddhism making up small minorities. There is also a small minority of Christians and Sikhs in the region.

Notable residents 
 Ram Prasad Bismil: Indian revolutionary, from the village of Barbai
 Paan Singh Tomar, first an athlete in Bhidosa (Morena), seven times national champion in steeplechase, who represented India in Asian Games held in Japan, who later turned into an outlaw/ dacoit.
 Narendra Singh Tomar: Minister of Agriculture & Farmers Welfare, Minister of Rural Development and Minister of Food Processing Industries in the Second Modi ministry
 Ashok Argal: Mayor of Morena Municipal Corporation
 Collector: B. Karthikeyan IAS
 SP: Lalit Shakyawar IPS

References

External links
Morena District web site
Morena Zila Panchayat

 
Districts of Madhya Pradesh